Ibsen is a Norwegian family of Danish extraction. Its most famous members are playwright Henrik Ibsen, his son, statesman Sigurd Ibsen, and grandson, pioneer film director Tancred Ibsen. Several other family members have been noted artists.

History

The name Ibsen is a "frozen" patronymic, meaning "son of Ib." Ib is a Danish variant of Jacob. The name became frozen in the 17th century, while this practice was only widely adopted in Denmark in the 19th century and in Norway from around 1900. The phenomenon of patronymics becoming frozen started in the 17th century in bourgeois families in Denmark.

The family's earliest known ancestor is Rasmus Ibsen (1632–1703), a merchant in Stege, Denmark. Rasmus Ibsen's son, ship's captain and merchant Peter Ibsen (died 1765), settled in Norway as a burgher of Bergen. Peter's son Henrik Ibsen (1726–1765) became a ship's captain in Bergen. After his father died early and his mother Wenche Dishington remarried, Henrik's son Henrik Johan Ibsen (1765–1797) grew up in the household of parish priest Jacob von der Lippe, his stepfather. After Henrik Johan Ibsen, a ship's captain and merchant in Skien, died at sea outside Hesnes, his widow Johanne Plesner remarried to ship's captain Ole Paus, and their son Knud Ibsen grew up in the Paus household at Rising in Gjerpen. Knud Ibsen had several half siblings, among them judge and Member of Parliament Christian Cornelius Paus and banker and shipowner Christopher Blom Paus. Knud Ibsen married the niece of his stepfather, Marichen Altenburg (a daughter of shipowner Johan Andreas Altenburg and Hedevig Christine Paus), and became a prominent merchant in Skien. Knud and Marichen Ibsen were the parents of playwright Henrik Ibsen (married to Suzannah Thoresen), who in turn was the father of Prime Minister Sigurd Ibsen (married to Bergliot Bjørnson, the only daughter of Bjørnstjerne Bjørnson) and grandfather of film director Tancred Ibsen (married to Lillebil Krohn), novelist Irene Ibsen Bille (married to Josias Bille) and Eleonora Ibsen. Tancred's only child was diplomat Tancred Ibsen Jr.

The Ibsen family is becoming extinct (in the male line); the last living members (by birth) are Tancred Ibsen Jr.'s two daughters Nora and Hedda Ibsen. There are however a number of descendants of the family through female lines, namely descendants of Hedvig Ibsen (married Stousland), Irene Ibsen (married Bille), Nora Ibsen and Hedda Ibsen.

The Ibsen family in theatre

Henrik Ibsen's ancestry has been a much studied subject, due to his perceived foreignness (leading his biographer Henrik Jæger to famously state that "the ancestral Ibsen was a Dane") and due to the influence of his biography and family on his plays. Ibsen often made references to his family in his plays, sometimes by name, or by modelling characters after them. Hence, both of Eric's parents, Knud Ibsen and Marichen Ibsen, served as the models for various characters, a fact admitted by Henrik Ibsen. "Jon Gynt" in Peer Gynt, "Old Ekdahl" in The Wild Duck and Daniel Hejre in The League of Youth are widely considered to be based on Knud Ibsen. Marichen Ibsen is considered the model for "Åse" in Peer Gynt and "Inga of Varteig" in The Pretenders, and she would "echo through her son's work in unremitting portrayals of suffering women." More broadly, Ibsen used his own biography, relatives and ancestors as a background for his plays and characters. The Gynt family's prosperous ancestor, Rasmus Gynt, is probably named for Rasmus Ibsen, the oldest known Ibsen, and modelled after Ibsen's wealthy maternal grandfather, Johan Andreas Altenburg. Ibsen's great-aunt Kristine Cathrine Ploug (née Altenburg), who lived with the Ibsen family, served as the model for characters such as "The Rat-Wife" in Little Eyolf. The character "Hedvig" in The Wild Duck is named for Ibsen's sister Hedvig Ibsen and/or his grandmother Hedevig Paus. Ibsen's plays often take place in bourgeois circles in small towns reminiscent of Skien, resembling the social environment of his childhood.

Members

Rasmus Ibsen (1632–1703), a ship's captain from Stege, Denmark.
Peder Rasmussen Ibsen (died 1765), ship's captain and merchant, settled in Bergen where he became a burgher.
Henrik Ibsen (1726–1765), merchant in Skien, who married Wenche Dishington (1738–1780). After Ibsen's death, Wenche married parish priest Jacob von der Lippe (1732–1804)
Henrich Ibsen (1765–1797), ship's captain and merchant in Skien, who married Johanne Plesner (1770–1847). Henrich Ibsen died at sea in 1797, and Johanne married shipowner Ole Paus (1776–1855).
Knud Ibsen (1797–1877), merchant in Skien until his bankruptcy in 1835, who married Marichen Altenburg (1799–1869).
Johan Altenburg Ibsen (1826–1828)
Henrik Ibsen (1828–1906), playwright, who married Suzannah Thoresen (1836–1914)
Sigurd Ibsen (1859–1930), Prime Minister of Norway, who married Bergliot Bjørnson (1869–1953)
Tancred Ibsen (1893–1978), film director, who married Lillebil Krohn (1899–1989)
Tancred Ibsen Jr. (born 1921), Ambassador, married Ellinor (b. 1922)
Nora Bergliot Ibsen (born 1951), theatre director, has issue
Hedda Sophie Yvonne Ibsen (born 1956), has issue
Irene Ibsen (1901–1985), author, who married Josias Bille, had issue (including sons Anders Bille (1940-2011) (grandsons: Steen Oluf Bille and Bernt Ivar Bille) and Joen Bille (b. 1944) (granddaughter Beate Bille and grandson Johan Peder Bille)
Eleonora Ibsen (1906–1978)
Johan Andreas Altenburg Ibsen (born 1830), emigrated to the US in 1849. According to a letter he sent home on May 28th 1850, he settled in Oconomowoc, Wisconsin. Whereabouts since unknown, no known issue.
Hedvig Ibsen (1831–1920), married ship's captain Jacob Stousland, had issue (including son Carl Stousland)
Nicolai Alexander Ibsen (1834–1888), unmarried, physically disabled after his nanny dropped him to the floor, emigrated to the US in the late 1860s, lived in Estherville, Iowa.
Ole Paus Ibsen (1835–1917), married Anne Marthe Boyesen and Jenny Myhre, no issue.

Illegitimate descendants of Henrik Ibsen
As legally established, Henrik Ibsen also had an illegitimate son by the maid Else Sophie Birkedalen (1818–1892), named Hans Jacob Henriksen (Birkedalen) (1846–1916) (Henriksen is an active patronymic, meaning "son of Henrik [Ibsen]", as opposed to the "frozen" patronymic Ibsen). Hans Jacob Henriksen was a blacksmith and married three times, to Mathilde Andreasdatter (1851–1881), Trine Marie Gunvaldsen (died 1882) and Ida Gurine Olsdatter (died 1938). He was the father of eight children, including
Jens Hansen Birkedalen (1876–1895), who was a ship's cook at the schooner "Josef af Lillesand", and who died at a hospital in Løgstør, Denmark
Ole Hansen Birkedalen (1884–1884), died as an infant
Isak Hansen Birkedalen (1885–1888), died as an infant
Inga Hansine Hansdatter Birkedalen (1888–1904)
Gunda Elise Hansdatter Birkedalen (1892–1896)
Jenny Hansdatter Birkedalen (1895–1922)
Henrik Ibsen had no contact with his illegitimate son or grandchildren, who lived in relatively humble conditions. Most of the grandchildren died as children, and neither of them had descendants. Even if they were male line descendants of the Ibsen family, they were not entitled to use the family name Ibsen under the law of the time, were hence legally not considered members of the Ibsen family, and had no inheritance rights. Henrik Ibsen was however obliged to pay for the upbringing of his son until he was 14 years old. After receiving a letter from Grimstad's judge Johan Caspar Preus on the paternity of the child, Henrik Ibsen acknowledged the paternity in a reply letter of 7 December 1846, as "I unfortunately have had sexual intercourse with her."

Footnotes

Literature
Johan Kielland Bergwitz, Henrik Ibsen i sin avstamning: norsk eller fremmed?, Gyldendal Norsk Forlag, 1916
Henrik Jæger, Henrik Ibsen, 1828-1888: A Critical Biography, A.C.McClurg, 1890 (1888)
Høgvoll, Arvid; Bærland, Ruth (1996). Henrik Ibsen: herregårder, kammerherrer, godseiere og proprietærer : brokker av en slektshistorie, Nome Antikvariat

Ibsen family
Norwegian people of Danish descent
Skien